Mvurachena Primary School is a Christian, independent, co-educational school in Chipinge, Zimbabwe.

Mvurachena Primary School is a member of the Association of Trust Schools (ATS) and the Head is a member of the Conference of Heads of Independent Schools in Zimbabwe (CHISZ).

History
Mvurachena Primary School was established in 1987 by the Chipinge Community.

Affiliations
Mvurachena Primary School is affiliated with the Association of Trust Schools (ATS) and the Head is affiliated with the Conference of Heads of Independent Schools in Zimbabwe. This means that both the school and the Headmaster are subject to the professional and ethical codes of conduct and must answer to these bodies in the event of disputes.

Admissions
Children go for an interview with at Mvurachena to assess the readiness of the child for the required level and to have a base reference before the child is enrolled.

Sports and activities
It is compulsory for all pupils to participate in sports at Mvurachena. The school offers athletics, cricket, cross country running, hockey, rugby, soccer, swimming, and tennis

Mvurachena also offers art and horse riding clubs.

See also

List of schools in Zimbabwe

References

External links
 Mvurachena School website

Private schools in Zimbabwe
Co-educational schools in Zimbabwe
Boarding schools in Zimbabwe
1987 establishments in Zimbabwe
Educational institutions established in 1987
Member schools of the Association of Trust Schools
Education in Manicaland Province